Gapyeong Station is a railway station of the Gyeongchun Line in Gapyeong-eup, Gapyeong-gun, Gyeonggi-do, South Korea. Its station subname is Jarasum·Namiseom, named for the nearby islands of Jarasum & Namiseom. It is also served by the ITX-Cheongchun between Chuncheon and Yongsan.

Station Layout

Gallery

Railway stations in Gyeonggi Province
Metro stations in Gapyeong County
Seoul Metropolitan Subway stations
Railway stations opened in 1939
Gyeongchun Line